Nikolai Vasilievich Ardelyan (born 18 September 1953) is a Russian mathematician, Professor, Dr.Sc., Honored Scientist of the Moscow State University, Leading Researcher of the MSU Faculty of Computational Mathematics and Cybernetics.

He defended the thesis «Difference-Operational Diagrams of the Dynamics of a Magnetic Gas» by the degree of Doctor of Physical and Mathematical Sciences (1992).

Author of 4 books and more than 160 scientific articles.

Honored Research Fellow of Moscow State University (2003).

References

Literature

External links
 
 
 Math-net.ruScientific works of Sergei Abramov

Russian computer scientists
Living people
Russian mathematicians
Academic staff of Moscow State University
1953 births
Moscow State University alumni